Azamat Zaurovich Balkarov (born 5 February 1987) is a Russian former professional football player.

Club career
He made his Russian Football National League debut for PFC Spartak Nalchik on 11 July 2016 in a game against FC Kuban Krasnodar.

External links
 
 

1987 births
Sportspeople from Nalchik
Living people
Russian footballers
Association football midfielders
PFC Spartak Nalchik players
FC Angusht Nazran players
FC Chernomorets Novorossiysk players
FC TSK Simferopol players